Choreutis topitis is a moth in the family Choreutidae. It was described by John Hartley Durrant in 1915. It is found on New Guinea.

References

Choreutis
Moths described in 1915